Jamaica started metrication in the 1970s. However, it was not completed until the 2000s.

Since the 1970s, metric units were introduced into the curriculum of the primary and secondary school systems. The Common Entrance and CXC examinations syllabus use metric units. The Ministry of Education also supports a policy of procuring metric-only textbooks for use in the school system. The informal sector involving vocational, adult literacy and retraining facilities were also being transformed.

Large producers of staple foods such as flour, rice, salt, sugar, chicken and other meats, supply products in metric units. A main objective of the Bureau of Standards, a targeted area of work of its Metrication Department, is to have outlets supplying everyday breakbulk items trade in metric units. While not yet a majority, large and medium-sized wholesale and retail outlets, such as supermarkets and fabric stores, have converted islandwide, particularly in the capital Kingston and adjoining urban centres.

On 10 June 2015, the Jamaican government passed the Road Traffic Bill 2014, which formally repealed and replaced the Road Traffic Act and Regulations 1938. The act included updates to Jamaica's traffic laws along with the use of the metric system within regulatory descriptions.

On 18 September 2015, the Jamaican government amended the Weights and Measure Act to include considerable fines to business owners who do not use the metric system.

See also
Metrication

References 

Science and technology in Jamaica
Jamaica